Pithecopus araguaius is a species of frog in the family Hylidae, endemic to Brazil.  It has been observed in Mato Grasso.

The holotype male measured 30.6 mm long in snout-vent length.  The skin of the dorsum and backs of the legs and feet is green in color.  This frog has a green stripe on each hind leg and a dark stripe on each flank.  There is orange coloration on the front legs and hidden parts of the thighs.  Portions of the lips are white in color.

Scientists named this frog araguaius after the nearby Araguaia River.

References

Endemic fauna of Brazil
Amphibians described in 2017
Frogs of South America